The following are the national records in Olympic weightlifting in Iceland. Records are maintained in each weight class for the snatch lift, clean and jerk lift, and the total for both lifts by the Lyftingasamband Íslands (LSÍ).

Current records
Key to tables:

Men

Women

Historical records

Men (1998–2018)

Women (1998–2018)

References
General
Icelandic records – Men 11 November 2022 updated
Icelandic records – Women 18 December 2022 updated
Specific

External links
LSI website
Historical records

Iceland
records
Olympic weightlifting
weightlifting